= Centres d'accueil et d'orientation =

The Reception and Orientation Center ("Centres d'accueil et d'orientation - CAO") is a French government program for asylum seekers that provide migrants with information and temporary accommodation. At the CAOs, migrants have access to health care, social and administrative support by qualified agents and associations. The centers are located in "former gendarme barracks, disused hospitals and training-centres, and out-of-season holiday villages". Currently, there are around 450 CAOs.

== Context ==
The CAOs were created by the Ministry of the Interior and the Ministry of Housing and Sustainable Housing in 2015, as a response to an increase in asylum applications and the creation of irregular encampments in Calais and Dunkirk. After the evacuation of Calais, 9.000 places were created in the CAOs, bringing it to a total of 12.000.

== Objective ==
The reception centers aim to shelter asylum seekers, and to orient them according to their particular situation. The OFII (French Office for Immigration and Integration) is responsible for providing information on the asylum procedure, and to direct migrants towards accommodation in the national system of reception for asylum seekers (e.g. CADA, UTSA, HUDA).

The average cost of a place in the CAOs is €25 per person per day, including accommodation, 3 meals a day and administrative support.
